Thomas Lombard (born July 5, 1975 in Le Chesnay), is a French rugby union player.

Thomas Lombard began playing Rugby Union with Racing but he moved to Stade Français with whom he won four top 14s. After a new title in 2004, he left Paris to play for Worcester Warriors. He then returned to his original club, Racing. He earned his first cap for the France national team on November 14, 1998 against Argentina. In 2001 he played his last test for France during the Six Nations Championship against Wales.

Honour
Stade Français
Top 14 1998, 2000, 2003, 2004
Coupe de France 1999
Racing Métro 92
Pro D2 2009

References

French rugby union players
France international rugby union players
1975 births
Living people
Rugby union centres
Rugby union wings